Baroja is a surname. Notable people with the surname include:

Alain Baroja (born 1989), Venezuelan footballer
Carmen Baroja (1883–1950), Spanish writer and ethnologist 
José Baroja (1983-), Chilean writer 
Julio Caro Baroja (1914–1995), Spanish anthropologist, historian, linguist and essayist
Pío Baroja (1872–1956), Spanish writer
Pío Caro Baroja (1928–2015), Spanish film and television director, screenwriter, and author
Ricardo Baroja (1871–1953), Spanish painter, writer and engraver
Serafin Baroja (1840–1912), Spanish writer and engineer